The Bulgaria cricket team toured Romania in October 2020 to contest the Balkan Cup over four Twenty20 International (T20I) matches. The matches were played between 16 and 18 October 2020 at the Moara Vlasiei Cricket Ground in Ilfov County. Romania's only previous official T20I matches were played in August 2019 during the Continental Cup, which was also hosted at the Moara Vlasiei Ground. Bulgaria lost their previous series against Malta a month prior to this tour. Bulgaria won the opening match, but Romania took both matches on the second day. The Bulgarians were bowled out for only 60 runs in the final game and Romania went on to claim the series 3–1.

Squads

T20I series

1st T20I

2nd T20I

3rd T20I

4th T20I

References

External links
 Series home at ESPN Cricinfo

Associate international cricket competitions in 2020–21